Ercé-en-Lamée (literally Ercé in Lamée) is a commune in the Ille-et-Vilaine department in Brittany in northwestern France.

Geography
The river Semnon forms all of the commune's northern border.

Population  
Inhabitants of Ercé-en-Lamée are called Ercéens in French.

See also
Communes of the Ille-et-Vilaine department

References

External links

Mayors of Ille-et-Vilaine Association  

Communes of Ille-et-Vilaine